Hackney Power Station (also known as Millfields Power Station or Millfields Electricity Generating Station) was a coal-fired power station situated at Lea Bridge on the River Lee Navigation in London.

History

The 'A' station, opened in 1901, was built by the Borough of Hackney. Upon nationalisation of the electricity industry in 1948, the power station passed to the British Electricity Authority. It originally burned local refuse as well as coal. The A station closed in 1969.

Following nationalisation a 'B' station was built, coming to use between 1954 and 1957. The B station was itself closed on 25 October 1976 with a generating capacity of 92 MW. It has been partially demolished, a sub-station remaining in part of the original buildings.

Coal was originally shipped up the Navigation from the Thames. However, in later years, as lighterage declined, up to thirty lorries per day transported coal to the station; the station was isolated from the railway system by the Lea and Hackney Marshes.

In 1967 it was reported by a resident that coal dust from lorries delivering coal to Hackney power station 'lies like a black carpet in the front of our houses'. A Ministry of Transport spokesman said that delivering coal to the station by road instead of barges saves £33,450 a year.

Parts of the site and the land immediately adjacent to it now serve as the Hackney Council Millfields Waste Depot and electricity substations operated by UK Power Networks and National Grid, including 66kV, 132kV, 275kV and 400kV substations.

The power station and its chimney features in a 1977 silent short film by experimental filmmaker John Smith titled Hackney Marshes - November 4th 1977.

Specification
New generating equipment was added as the demand for electricity increased. The generating capacity, maximum load, and electricity generated and sold was as follows:

In 1923 the AC plant comprised: 1 × 3,000 kW, 1 × 5,000 kW, and 1 × 6,000 kW turbo-alternators. The DC supply was generated by 2 × 300 kW, 1 × 600 kW and 2 × 1,500 kW reciprocating engines and generators. The total installed generating capacity was 18,200 kW. The boiler plant produced a total of 229,00 lb/hr (28.85 kg/s) of steam. In 1923 the station generated 21.465 GWh of electricity, some of this was used in the plant, the total amount sold was 18.582 GWh. The revenue from sales of current was £151,291, this gave a surplus of revenue over expenses of £86,419.

By 1963-64 the A station had 2 × 30 MW generators. The steam capacity of the boilers was 1,014,000 lb/hr (127.8 kg/s). Steam conditions at the turbine stop valves was 200/370 psi (13.8/25.5 bar) and 282/416 °C. The boilers were chain grate stoked. In 1963-64 the overall thermal efficiency of the A station was 14.55 per cent.

By 1963-64 the B station had 2 × 33 MW Parsons and 1 × 30 MW Parsons generators. There were 3 × 300,000 lb/hr (37.8 kg/s) Simon-Carves boilers giving a total steam capacity of 930,000 lb/hr (117.2 kg/s). Steam conditions at the turbine stop valves was 600 psi (41.4 bar) and 464 °C. The boilers used pulverised fuel. In 1963-64 the overall thermal efficiency of the A station was 25.48 per cent. There was a single wood cooling tower with a capacity of 2.25 million gallons per hour (2.84 m3/s), make-up water was from the River Lea.

Electricity output from Hackney power station was as follows.

Hackney A annual electricity output GWh.Hackney B annual electricity output GWh.

References

Coal-fired power stations in England
Former power stations in London
Demolished power stations in the United Kingdom
Former power stations in England